The 2020–21 Combined Counties Football League season (known as the 2020–21 Cherry Red Records Combined Counties Football League for sponsorship reasons) was the 43rd in the history of the Combined Counties Football League, a football competition in England. Teams were divided for the final time into two divisions; the Premier and the First. The constitution was announced on 21 July 2020. After the abandonment of the previous season due to the COVID-19 pandemic, the league's constitution remained largely unchanged, with the planned structural changes being put in place after this season.

The 2020–21 season started in September and was suspended on 21 December again as a result of the COVID-19 pandemic in England. The league season was subsequently abandoned. The league committee later announced a supplementary cup competition, the Fripp-Smith Trophy, to provide competitive football for their clubs. All clubs were invited to take part, with 23 ultimately accepting.

Promotion, relegation and restructuring
The scheduled restructuring of non-league football took place at the end of the season to include a new division that was added to the Combined Counties at step 5 for 2021–22. Promotions from steps 5 to 4 and 6 to 5 were based on points per game across all matches over the two abandoned seasons (2019–20 and 2020–21), while teams were promoted to step 6 on the basis of a subjective application process.

Premier Division

The Premier Division was reduced from 21 to 20 clubs after Balham transferred to the Southern Counties East League as they moved to groundshare with AFC Croydon Athletic.

League table at time of curtailment

Results table

Division One

Division One remained at 20 clubs, and was unchanged from the previous season.

Reserve sides are not eligible for promotion to Step 5.

League table at time of curtailment
<onlyinclude>

<onlyinclude>

Results table

Fripp-Smith Trophy
At the group stage, each team plays each other once.

Group A

Group B

Group C

Group D

Quarter-finals

Semi-finals

Final

References

External links
 Combined Counties League Official Site

2020-21
9
Combined Counties Football League, 202-21